Jana Adámková (born 27 January 1978) is a football referee from the Czech Republic. 

In the Czech Domestic league system, Adámková has refereed in the Czech First League.

At confederation level she has officiated at the UEFA Women's Champions League, UEFA Women's Euro. 

Adámková was appointed to be an official at the 2019 FIFA Women's World Cup in France.

References

Living people
1978 births
Czech football referees
FIFA Women's World Cup referees
Women association football referees
Sportspeople from Brno
UEFA Women's Euro 2022 referees